The 38th Golden Raspberry Awards, or Razzies, was an awards ceremony that honored the worst the film industry had to offer in 2017. The Golden Raspberry Awards were awarded based on votes from members of the Golden Raspberry Foundation. The nominees were announced on January 22, 2018, and the winners were announced on March 3, 2018.

With its nominations for Worst Picture, Worst Director, Worst Screen Combo, and Worst Screenplay, The Emoji Movie became the first full-length animated motion picture to receive nominations for those specific categories at the Golden Raspberry Awards and to win all of these awards. A new award was also created, sponsored by Rotten Tomatoes, for "The Razzie Nominee So Rotten You Loved It", where the website readers voted for their favorite film which they thought was unfairly nominated, which was won by Baywatch. One of the film's stars, Dwayne Johnson, accepted the prize, albeit not in person. He did post a video online saying: "We made Baywatch with the best of intentions, it didn't work out like that, but I humbly and graciously accept my Razzie. And I thank you, critics, and I thank you, fans."

With 10 nominations and no wins, Transformers: The Last Knight breaks the record for most nominations without a win, beating original record holder Grown Ups 2.

Winners and nominees

Films with multiple wins and nominations
The following nine films received multiple nominations:

* Films that shared at least one nomination with another.

The following films received multiple wins:

Criticism 
Following the nomination announcement, the organization received backlash from audiences and critics with three nominations given to Mother!, which received a generally positive response from critics. The ballot was also criticized for overlooking Dane DeHaan and Cara Delevingne critically panned performances in Luc Besson's film Valerian and the City of a Thousand Planets, despite the pre-nominations for Worst Picture and Besson for Worst Director, neither of both ended in the final ballot.

Box office performance of nominated films

See also
 90th Academy Awards
 75th Golden Globe Awards
 71st British Academy Film Awards
 33rd Independent Spirit Awards
 24th Screen Actors Guild Awards
 23rd Critics' Choice Awards

Notes

References

External links
 

Golden Raspberry Awards ceremonies
Golden Raspberry
Golden Raspberry
March 2018 events in the United States
Events in Los Angeles
2018 in Los Angeles